The Peugeot Type 28 is an early motor vehicle produced between 1899 and 1900 by the French auto-maker Peugeot at their Audincourt plant. Only 8 were produced.

The vehicle was powered by a rear-mounted 1012 cc two cylinder four stroke engine, manufactured by Peugeot themselves. The engine's two cylinders were mounted in parallel and not in the V-format used for the company's first petrol engined vehicles. The  mechanical approach and layout were similar to that used on the Peugeot Type 26. The engine was mounted behind the driver and his (or, at least in principle, her) passengers above the rear axle. A maximum speed of 35 km/h (22 mph) was claimed.

The car had much in common with the manufacturer’s more popular Type 26, introduced the same year, but the Type 28 was larger. The car featured an open-carriage format “phaeton” body designed to accommodate four people.

The Peugeot Type 28 was only produced until 1901.

Sources and further reading 
 Wolfgang Schmarbeck: Alle Peugeot Automobile 1890-1990. Motorbuch-Verlag. Stuttgart 1990. 

1900s cars
Type 28
Cars introduced in 1899
Rear-engined vehicles